Dominic Anthony Holland (born 6 May 1967) is an English comedian, author, actor and broadcaster. He won the 1993 Perrier Best Newcomer Award in Edinburgh. His BBC Radio 4 series, The Small World of Dominic Holland (a reference to his 5'6" height), won a Comic Heritage Award.

Early life and family
Holland was born in Brent, London, the son of Teresa (née Quigley) and John Holland. His father was from the Isle of Man and his mother was Irish. Raised Catholic, he attended the Cardinal Vaughan Memorial School. He later studied textile management at Leeds University, where he met his future wife, photographer Nicola Frost. He has four sons, including actor Tom Holland.

He is a fan of Brentford F.C stating on his official website "When I was a kid, I didn’t miss a Brentford home game for five years or so."

Career

Stand-up comedy 
Holland started performing stand-up comedy in 1991, making his debut at The Comedy Café, Rivington Street, London. In 1993, he was briefly managed by Eddie Izzard. In Holland's first year at the Edinburgh Fringe his one-man show won the Perrier Best Newcomer award and good notices. Later in the autumn of 1993, Holland supported Eddie Izzard on her national tour. In 1994, Holland returned to Edinburgh. In 1996, his show at the Edinburgh festival was nominated for the Perrier Award. Holland returned to the Edinburgh festival in 2006. In October 2012 Holland recorded his first stand up DVD at the Court Theatre in Tring.

The Sunday Times described Holland as "The UK's master of observational comedy" and The Daily Telegraph commented that "he is a top notch stand up who everyone should see". Bob Monkhouse called him "Britain's funniest not yet famous comedian".

Television
Holland made his TV debut appearance in 1993 on Central Television's Lafter Hours with Harry Hill. He was a team captain for two series of Bring Me the Head of Light Entertainment for Channel Five – with Graham Norton hosting in 1998. In 1999 and 2000, Holland appeared twice as a guest on Have I Got News for You, They Think It's All Over, and in 2000 The Royal Variety Performance. He has appeared on Rob Brydon's Annually Retentive. He has been a regular panellist on the daytime debate show The Wright Stuff.

Holland has made numerous guest appearances on numerous television shows, including The Clive James Show, The Brian Conley Show, The Des O'Connor Show, and Never Mind the Buzzcocks. He has participated in the Richard and Judy Show as well as Boom Bang-a-Bang and the National Lottery Draw Show. He has written for the animated British sitcom, Warren United, originally titled The Wild World of Warren, produced for ITV by Baby Cow Productions. Six episodes were made, two of which co-written by Holland.

Radio

Holland's first foray into radio was on hospital radio when he joined North Middlesex Hospital's radio station, Radio North Mid in 1990.

The Small World of Dominic Holland was a radio programme written and presented by Holland, featuring his stand-up work, but including sketches. One series of the show was commissioned in 2000. This was first broadcast on BBC Radio 4 and won a Comic Heritage Award. It has been repeated on BBC 7.

His second radio series on Radio 4, Holland's Shorts. was a series of comic monologues written and performed by Holland. In 2011 he appeared  on Radio 4's The News Quiz, hosted by Sandi Toksvig. Holland was co-writer of Hal, a 2017 sitcom commissioned by BBC Radio 4, that starred Hal Cruttenden, in which Holland also appeared. He also made regular appearances in the early seasons of BBC Radio 5 Live's comedy sports panel show, Fighting Talk.

Film
Holland debuted in 1982 in a small role of 'schoolboy' in Channel 4 film P'tang, Yang, Kipperbang. In 1998 he played "Bob" in The Young Person's Guide to Becoming a Rock Star. In 1999 he appeared as "Cello Player" in Tube Tales. Holland has written four screenplays, three of which have been sold to producers, but as yet, have not been made into films.

Writing
Holland has written material for Bob Monkhouse, Lenny Henry, Harry Enfield, Des O'Connor, Clive Anderson and many others. Holland has published two comic novels, Only in America and The Ripple Effect. His third novel, A Man's Life, was published in 2013. For two years Holland wrote the Funny Money column for The Guardian. In January 2013 Holland published How Tom Holland Eclipsed His Dad. He published 'The Fruit Bowl' on July 13, 2020. Published on November 22, 2020, Takes on Life Vol. 1 contains thirty-one autobiographical essays or "Takes" on the life of Dominic Holland.

Bibliography
 Takes on Life Vol. 1, 2020,  
 The Fruit Bowl, 2020, 
 How Tom Holland Eclipsed His Dad, Amazon.co.uk, 2013, ASIN: B00B0XBSG6
 A Man's Life (novel) Smashwords, 2012, 
 The Ripple Effect (novel) Flame, 2003, ; 
 Only in America (novel) Flame, 2002, ; 
 Sit-Down Comedy (contributor to anthology, ed Malcolm Hardee & John Fleming) Ebury Press/Random House, 2003, ; 
 Ha Bloody Ha: Comedians Talking (contributor, ed William Cook) Fourth Estate 1994,  ;

References

1967 births
Living people
21st-century English novelists
English Roman Catholics
English comedy writers
English male comedians
English male film actors
English people of Irish descent
English people of Manx descent
English stand-up comedians
People educated at Cardinal Vaughan Memorial School
People from the London Borough of Brent